Dlagnya Rocks (‘Skali Dlagnya’ \ska-'li 'dl&g-nya\) are the several contiguous rocks in Zed Islands off Varna Peninsula, Livingston Island in the South Shetland Islands extending 540 m in north-south direction and 60 m wide.  The area was visited by early 19th century sealers.

The rocks are named after the settlement of Dlagnya in Northern Bulgaria.

Location
British mapping in 1968 and Bulgarian mapping in 2009.

Maps
 Livingston Island to King George Island.  Scale 1:200000.  Admiralty Nautical Chart 1776.  Taunton: UK Hydrographic Office, 1968.
 L.L. Ivanov. Antarctica: Livingston Island and Greenwich, Robert, Snow and Smith Islands. Scale 1:120000 topographic map. Troyan: Manfred Wörner Foundation, 2009.  (Second edition 2010)
Antarctic Digital Database (ADD). Scale 1:250000 topographic map of Antarctica. Scientific Committee on Antarctic Research (SCAR). Since 1993, regularly upgraded and updated.

References
 Bulgarian Antarctic Gazetteer. Antarctic Place-names Commission. (details in Bulgarian, basic data in English)
 Dlagnya Rocks. SCAR Composite Antarctic Gazetteer.

External links
 Dlagnya Rocks. Copernix satellite image

Rock formations of Livingston Island
Bulgaria and the Antarctic